Chelsea Holmes (actor)
Chelsea Holmes (skier) born 1987